The  is a jazz club in Shinjuku, Tokyo. The original opened in 1966 and was forced by demolition to close in 1992. It re-opened at a different site in Shinjuku later that year. DownBeat wrote in 2019 that the Pit Inn "is almost universally regarded as Japan's most important jazz club".

First Shinjuku Pit Inn
The first Pit Inn was located in Shinjuku 3-chōme. It opened in February 1966, as a jazz coffee shop. Two years later, it became even more focused on jazz and was in the style of a Greenwich Village hangout. From its early days, both domestic and international musicians played there. In 1968, for instance, The Thad Jones/Mel Lewis Orchestra played at the Pit Inn. Other activities also took place: a photography exhibition in 1968 was an early example. Some of the most prominent Japanese jazz musicians played at the club early in their careers. Many continue to play there regularly, including Terumasa Hino, Sadao Watanabe and Yōsuke Yamashita. Trumpeter Hino played there in 1969. In 1970, the standard entrance charges were 450 Yen for the 2pm show and 500 Yen for the 7pm one, with one drink included. It was described as "A comfortably dingy, often smoke-filled niche for the serious jazz fan [...] over the years it had been home to performances and recordings by some of the world's greatest jazz musicians". In January 1992, it was forced to close, as the building it was part of was being demolished.

Second Shinjuku Pit Inn
The Pit Inn reopened in July 1992, at a new location at the edge of Shinjuku 2-chōme. It continued to offer an afternoon and an evening performance, with the former being for less-well-established musicians. The fortieth anniversary celebrations featured performances by Hino, Watanabe, Yamashita, Keiko Lee, Otomo Yoshihide, John Zorn and others, playing in a nearby rented hall, as the club was too small to accommodate all the fans.

Other Pit Inns
There have been other jazz clubs with the same name in other parts of Tokyo and Japan. The Roppongi Pit Inn was open from at least 1978, and was at Shimei Building B1, Roppongi 3-17-7. In 2003, it contained wooden pews and chairs, and "ceiling-high speakers angle[d] in to cover the entire audience space with crisp sound resolution and exceptional clarity". It closed on 26 July 2004.

Concert recordings
An asterisk (*) indicates that the album was recorded at the Roppongi Pit Inn.

Notes

References

Jazz clubs in Japan